This is a list of notable international schools from around the world.

Albania

Algeria

Andorra

Angola

Antigua and Barbuda

Argentina

Armenia

Aruba

Australia

Austria

Azerbaijan

The Bahamas

Bahrain

Bangladesh

Belgium

Benin

Bolivia

Brazil

Brunei

Bulgaria

Cambodia

Cameroon

Canada

Chile

China

Colombia

Costa Rica

Côte d'Ivoire

Croatia

Cuba

Curaçao

Cyprus

Czech Republic

Denmark

Dominican Republic

Ecuador

Academia Cotopaxi
Alliance Academy International
Colegio Americano de Quito
Colegio Menor San Francisco de Quito
Inter-American Academy of Guayaquil

Egypt

El Salvador

Ethiopia

{{columns-list|colwidth=30em|

Addis Ababa University

Bahr Dar University 

Erythras International University

Jimma University

Rift Valley University

Finland

France

Georgia

Germany

Ghana

Greece

Guatemala

Honduras

Hong Kong

Hungary

Iceland 
 International School of Iceland

India

Indonesia

Jakarta

Other locations in Indonesia

Ireland

Israel

Italy

Japan

Jordan

Kazakhstan

Kenya

Korea

Kuwait

Kyrgyzstan

Laos

Latvia

Lebanon

Lesotho

Luxembourg

Macau

Madagascar

Malaysia

Kuala Lumpur

Malawi

Malta

Mauritius

Mexico

Mongolia

Morocco

Myanmar

Namibia

Netherlands

Netherlands Antilles

New Zealand

Nicaragua

Lincoln International Academy
Nicaragua Christian Academy
Notre Dame School

Niger

Nigeria

Charles Dale Memorial International School
First Island Montessori School
Hillcrest School
International School Ibadan
International School Lagos
Olashore International School

Norway

Oman

Pakistan
The International School, Karachi

Panama

Papua New Guinea

Paraguay

Peru

Philippines

Poland

Portugal

Qatar

Romania

Russia

Saudi Arabia

Senegal

 Lycée Jean Mermoz (Senegal)

Serbia

Seychelles

Singapore

Slovakia

Slovenia

South Africa

Spain

Sri Lanka

Sudan

eSwatini

Sweden

Switzerland

Syria

Taiwan

Tajikistan

Tanzania

Thailand

Togo

Trinidad and Tobago

Tunisia

Turkey

Uganda

Ukraine

United Arab Emirates

United Kingdom

United States

Uruguay

Venezuela

Vietnam

Yemen

Zambia

Zimbabwe

See also

 Lists of schools

 International schools